The 1933 Paris–Nice was the first running of the Paris–Nice cycling stage race, also known as the Race to the Sun. It was set up by Albert Lucas to promote two newspapers he ran, Le Petit Journal and Le Petit Nice. It ran from 14 March to 19 March 1933. The winner was Alfons Schepers.

Stages

14 March 1933: Paris – Dijon, 312 km.

15 March 1933: Dijon – Lyon, 198 km.

16 March 1933: Lyon – Avignon, 222 km.

17 March 1933: Avignon – Marseille, 204 km.

18 March 1933: Marseille – Cannes, 209 km.

19 March 1933: Cannes – Nice, 110 km.

References 

1933
1933 in French sport
1933 in road cycling
March 1933 sports events